Deborah A. Miranda is a Native American writer, poet, and professor of English at Washington and Lee University. Her father, Alfred Edward Robles Miranda is from the Esselen and Chumash people, native to the Santa Barbara/Santa Ynez/Monterey, California area. Her mother, Madgel Eleanor (Yeoman) Miranda was of French and Jewish ancestry. Miranda is a descendant of what are known as "Mission Indians," indigenous peoples of many Southern California tribes who were forcibly removed from their land into several Franciscan missions. She is an enrolled member of the Ohlone-Costanoan Esselen Nation.

Life, Education and Career
At a young age, Miranda experienced family trauma. When she was three, her father was sentenced to prison, and her mother moved the family to Washington state. As another example, when she was 7, after her family moved, a friend of her mothers had raped her. Growing up in a new state without her father, Miranda questioned her identity, and used writing as a way to make sense of her family history. When father was released from prison, he and her mother started to get back to their tribal roots. To escape her family trauma, she married her high school teacher and moved in him and his 2 children. The Ohlone-Costanoan Esselen people have dealt with identity stripping, since the majority of tribal nations residing in Southern California were forced out.

Miranda attended Wheelock College with a focus on teaching moderate special needs children. After receiving her B.S., she earned her MA and Ph.D. in English from the University of Washington. She went on to become Thomas H. Broadhus professor of English at Washington and Lee University in Lexington, Virginia, where she taught creative writing, with a research interest in Native American culture. In her scholarship, Miranda explores the ways in which the American canon has repressed and subjugated Indigenous culture, while giving breath to other historically marginalized groups, such as the Chicanos and Chicanas, African Americans, Japanese Americans, Chinese Americans, Appalachians, Southern Americans, and more. In 2012, Miranda received a Lenfest Sabbatical Grant for her project "The Hidden Stories of Isabel Meadows and Other California Indian Lacunae". In 2015, she won a PEN Oakland/Josephine Miles Literary Award.

Miranda maintains a blog and Twitter account known as BAD NDNS, where she writes about her life, poetry, and essential histories. She is married to Margo Solod and has two children, Miranda and Danny. A lot of her poetry was motivated through her mixed-blood ancestry and focused on the natural world, gender, mothering, and the ability to power through living in a violent world.

Published Work

Books
One of Miranda's major works is Bad Indians: A Tribal Memoir (2013), in which she discusses the multiple time-frames and decades that the Esselen Nation and California Indians have dealt with. Also included in this memoir are Miranda's encounters with her family endeavors and actual news clippings and testimonies to emphasize the hardships felt at this time. Through these archival texts and her own personal testimony Miranda provides a unique exploration of the legacies of Indigenous genocide in California.

In 2017, Miranda was a co-editor of the two-spirit literature collection Sovereign Erotics. She is considered one of many important two-spirit writers working to reclaim buried histories of third genders from colonial erasure.

Other major books include:

The Zen of La Llorona, Salt Publishing, 2005.
Indian Cartography, Greenfield Review Press, 1999, Cover Art by Kathleen Smith (Dry Creek Pomo/Bodega Miwok)
Altar to Broken Things, BkMk Press 2020.
Raised By Humans, Tia Chucha Press 2015.

Poetry and essays
Miranda's poetry is widely anthologized, and she also writes scholarly articles tackling such issues as racism, colonialism, misogyny, intergenerational trauma, childhood trauma, identity, environmental crises, the political climate, and linguistic barriers. Some examples include:

"Lunatic or Lover, Madman or Shaman: The Role of the Poet in Contemporary Culture(s)." Stealing Light: A Raven Chronicles Anthology. Raven Chronicle Press. 2018.
"Tuolumne" in World Literature Today. May 2017.
"What's Wrong with a Little Fantasy? Storytelling from the (still) Ivory Tower" in American Indian Quarterly, vol. 27, no. 1&2.
"A String of Textbooks: Artifacts of Composition Pedagogy in Indian Boarding Schools." The Journal of Teaching Writing. Vol. 16.2, Fall 2000.
"I Don't Speak the Language that has the Sentences: An Interview with Paula Gunn Allen" in Sojourner: The Women's Forum. February 1999, Vol. 24, No. 2.
"A Strong Woman Pursuing Her God: Linda Hogan's Power" in Sojourner: The Women's Forum. November 2000, Vol. 26, No. 3.

References

External links
Deborah Miranda page at the Poetry Foundation
Deborah A. Miranda's faculty page at Washington and Lee University
Miranda Named Visiting Scholar at UCLA's Institute of American Cultures
A short biography from the Internet Public Library's Native American Authors Project

Native American academics
Native American women academics
American women academics
Native American women writers
1961 births
University of Washington alumni
Living people
Pacific Lutheran University faculty
LGBT Native Americans
LGBT people from California
Native American poets
American women poets
20th-century American poets
21st-century American poets
Washington and Lee University faculty
Writers from Los Angeles
American people of French descent
American people of Jewish descent
Chumash people
Wheelock College alumni
Poets from California
Poets from Washington (state)
20th-century American women writers
21st-century American women writers
20th-century Native American women
20th-century Native Americans
21st-century Native American women
21st-century Native Americans